1,2-Dichloroethene, commonly called 1,2-dichloroethylene or 1,2-DCE, is the name for a pair of organochlorine compounds with the molecular formula CHCl.  They are both colorless liquids with a sweet odor.  It can exist as either of two geometric isomers, cis-1,2-dichloroethene or trans-1,2-dichloroethene, but is often used as a mixture of the two.  They have modest solubility in water.  These compounds have some applications as a degreasing solvent. In contrast to most cis-trans compounds, the Z isomer (cis) is more stable than the E isomer (trans) by 0.4 kcal/mol.

Production and use
cis-DCE, the Z isomer, is obtainable by the controlled chlorination of acetylene:

CH  +  Cl   →   CHCl

Industrially both isomers arise as byproducts of the production of vinyl chloride, which is produced on a vast scale.  Unlike 1,1-dichloroethylene, the 1,2-dichloroethylene isomers do not polymerize.

trans-DCE has applications including electronics cleaning, precision cleaning, and certain metal cleaning applications.

Reactions
Both isomers participate in Kumada coupling reactions.  trans-1,2-Dichloroethylene participates in cycloaddition reactions.

Safety
These compounds have "moderate oral toxicity to rats".

Environmental aspects

The dichloroethylene isomers occur in some polluted waters and soils.  Significant attention has been paid to their further degradation, e.g. by iron particles.

See also
 1,1-Dichloroethene
 1,2-Dichloroethane, which is also often abbreviated as 1,2-DCA

References

External links

Chloroalkenes
Halogenated solvents